The Cathedral of Saint Domnius, known locally as the Sveti Dujam or colloquially Sveti Duje, is the Catholic cathedral in  Split, Croatia.  The cathedral is the seat of the Archdiocese of Split-Makarska, headed by Archbishop Marin Barišić.  The Cathedral of St. Domnius is a complex of a church, formed from an Imperial Roman mausoleum, with a bell tower; strictly the church is dedicated to the Virgin Mary, and the bell tower to Saint Domnius. Together they form the Cathedral of St. Domnius.

The Cathedral of Saint Domnius, consecrated at the turn of the 7th century AD, is regarded as the oldest Catholic cathedral in the world that remains in use in its original structure, without near-complete renovation at a later date (though the bell tower dates from the 12th century). The structure itself, built in AD 305 as the Mausoleum of Diocletian, is the second oldest structure used by any Christian Cathedral.

Name
The cathedral was named after Saint Domnius (Saint Dujam, or Saint Domnius) patron saint of Split, who was a 3rd-century Bishop of Salona. Salona was a large Roman city serving as capital of the Province of Dalmatia. Today it is located near the city of Solin in Croatia. Saint Domnius was martyred with seven other Christians in the persecutions of the Emperor Diocletian. He was born in Antioch, in modern-day Turkey, and beheaded in 304 at Salona.

Architecture

Diocletian's Palace is a building in the centre of Split, built for the Emperor Diocletian (a native of Dalmatia) at the turn of the 4th century. On the intersection of two main roads, cardo and decumanus, there is a monumental court Peristyle, from which the only access to Cathedral of St. Domnius is to the east.

The Cathedral of St. Domnius is composed of three different sections of different ages. The main part is Emperor Diocletian's mausoleum, which dates from the end of the 3rd century. The mausoleum was built like the rest of the palace with white local limestone and marble of high quality, most of which was from marble quarries on the island of Brač, with tuff taken from the nearby river Jadro beds, and with brick made in Salonitan and other factories.

Later, in the 17th century a choir was added to the eastern side of the mausoleum. For that purpose the eastern wall of the mausoleum was torn down in order to unify the two chambers.

The bell tower was constructed in the year 1100 AD, in the Romanesque style. Extensive rebuilding in 1908 radically changed the Bell Tower, and many of the original Romanesque sculptures were removed.

One of the best examples of Romanesque sculpture in Croatia, are the wooden doors on Cathedral of St. Domnius. They were made by the medieval Croatian sculptor and painter Andrija Buvina around 1214. Two wings of the Buvina wooden door contains 14 scenes from the life of Jesus Christ, separated by rich ornaments in wood.

Treasury
On the first floor of the sacristy is the cathedral treasury, which contains relics of Saint Domnius, which were brought to the cathedral after his death.

Other treasures include sacral art works, like the Romanesque The Madonna and Child panel painting from the 13th century, objects like chalices and reliquaries by goldsmiths from the 13th to the 19th century, and mass vestments from the 14th until 19th century. It also contains famous books like the Book of gospels (Splitski Evandelistar) from the 6th century, the Supetar cartulary (Kartularium from Sumpetar)  from the 11th century, and the Historia Salonitana (The History of the people of Salona) by Thomas the Archdeacon from Split in the 13th century.

See also
History of Roman and Byzantine domes

References

External links

 Grad Split Official Split web page 
 Splitsko-makarska nadbiskupija Official Archdiocese web page 

World Heritage Sites in Croatia
Archaeological sites in Croatia
Saint Domnius
Ancient Roman buildings and structures in Croatia
Romanesque architecture
3rd-century churches
Roman emperors' mausoleums
Roman Catholic cathedrals in Croatia
Tourist attractions in Split